A chalupa is a tostada platter in Mexican cuisine.

Chalupa may also refer to:

Chalupa (boat)
Chalupa (surname)
Chałupa, a settlement in Pomeranian Voivodeship, Poland

See also